The Drowning is a 2008 novel by Camilla Läckberg.  Its Swedish title is "Sjöjungfrun," literally translated in English as "The Mermaid".

Like Margaret Atwood's The Blind Assassin, The Drowning contains a novel within a novel: 'The Mermaid' is that story.

References

Novels by Camilla Läckberg
2008 Swedish novels
Swedish crime novels
Novels set in Sweden